Rondonópolis Esporte Clube, commonly known as Rondonópolis, is a Brazilian football club based in Rondonópolis, Mato Grosso state.

History
The club was founded on December 10, 2006. They regularly competes in the Campeonato Mato-Grossense since 2008. Rondonópolis won the Copa Governador do Mato Grosso in 2013.

Achievements

 Copa Governador do Mato Grosso:
 Winners (1): 2013

Stadium
Rondonópolis Esporte Clube play their home games at Estádio Engenheiro Luthero Gomes, nicknamed Caldeirão. The stadium has a maximum capacity of 19,000 people.

References

Association football clubs established in 2006
Football clubs in Mato Grosso
2006 establishments in Brazil
Rondonópolis